Thompson Donald (1876-1957) was a Northern Irish Unionist politician.

Donald was elected to the House of Commons of the United Kingdom in the 1918 general election for the Belfast Victoria constituency and served as MP until the constituency's abolition in 1922. Donald was elected as one of the so-called 'Labour Unionists' of the Ulster Unionist Labour Association. He was secretary of this group although as an MP for both Belfast Victoria and Belfast East in the Parliament of Northern Ireland (1921-1925) he was effectively an Ulster Unionist Party representative.

Anti-Home Rule campaign 
Donald was born at Ballydown in Islandmagee, County Antrim on 12 May 1876 and was the son of shoemaker Edward Donald and Mary Aiken. He left Islandmagee and became a shipwright in Belfast, employed by ship builders Messrs Workman & Clark. Donald became involved in trade unionism and was district secretary of the shipwrights union for several years until he was promoted to chief assistant foreman in 1912, at which point he retired from trade union activities. Politically he was a Unionist and was opposed to Home Rule. As part of the Ulster Covenant campaign against Home Rule the Northern Whig for Saturday, 25 April 1914 carried an "Appeal to British Trade Unionists to help resist Home Rule" signed by, amongst others, "Thompson Donald, Trade Union Congress delegate 1909 and 1911 – Shipwrights and Ship Constructors Society". Further appeals to trade unionists were issued in subsequent editions of the paper. He played a leading role in the formation of the Trades Union Watch Committee, which became the Unionist Watch Committee and then finally in July 1918 was renamed as the Ulster Unionist Labour Association (UULA). Donald was appointed an Honorary Secretary of this new group, which was organised by Edward Carson.

Westminster election of 1918 
The First World War ended in November 1918. A Westminster election was called for December 1918.
To attract the Unionist working class vote, trades union candidates were put forward under the UULA banner in three Belfast constituencies for the 1918 Westminster election. One of these was Thompson Donald standing in the Victoria Ward in East Belfast. He was a suitable candidate in that he was remembered as one of the organisers of the 1914 meeting against Home Rule, he had been a well known trade unionist, he was a member of the Orange Order and he was a Mason.
The NW of Wednesday 27 November 1918 featured in its Editorial the selection of Sir Edward Carson as the Parliamentary candidate for  Duncairn in the forthcoming  election. There were 1½ columns recounting his career and his seven years of leadership of the Ulster cause.
The NW of Saturday 30 November 1918 reported on electioneering in the Victoria Ward and Mr Thompson Donald's Candidature and the Meeting of Support held in the Sailor's Institute, Dock St.  ‘Mr Donald, who was enthusiastically received…..said he had the support of Sir Edward Carson.    He had been a teetotaller all his life and was in favour of prohibition…..There was a need for better schools…..He was out to get 10,000 comfortable workers’ houses built in Belfast’.    
The NW of Monday 2 December 1918 gave notice of ‘A Public Meeting of the Electors in support of Mr Thompson Donald to be held in the Old Town Hall on Friday at 8 o’clock.   The Rt Hon Sir Edward Carson will be in attendance.   The Candidate will address the Meeting.’  On 7 December the NW carried a 3½ column report largely relating to the speech Sir Edward Carson made in support of Mr Thompson Donald as a true Unionist candidate in the forthcoming election. ‘A number of questions were then put to the candidate by members of the audience, and were answered satisfactorily, the vote of confidence being passed unanimously’.
The NW of Saturday 14 December 1918 had a large advertisement addressed to the ‘Loyal Unionists of Belfast.   Keep the Old Flag Flying. The (seven) Constitutionally Selected Candidates are…Carson – Duncairn…..Donald – Victoria…..Whitla – Belfast University.   Vote for us and no other.     No Surrender!     Edward Carson’.
Monday 16 December 1918 was polling day. In Victoria Ward Donald had polled 9309 votes and won comfortably against the Labour candidate who had 3469 votes.   Thompson Donald thus became Thompson Donald MP and would remain so until the next election in 1922.   All three UULA candidates had won and were duly admitted as Members of Parliament to the Imperial Parliament at Westminster.
At Westminster the three were submerged in the Ulster Unionist Party.  They were entertained by the Duke of Abercorn and the Marquis of Dufferin and Ava and the experience allegedly went to their heads.   They were unable to live in London on their annual salaries of £400 and had to be assisted by the UUC.  As backbenchers their only role was to ask questions in the House. (It was agreed that Thompson Donald was the most active, but the presence of all three at Westminster dropped off after 1921 when they were elected to the first Northern Ireland Parliament).
However the BN on Monday 6 October 1919 reported  on a Labour Unionist meeting held in Belfast.   In the absence of Carson Mr Ronald McNeill gave the major speech and paid a high tribute to the three UULA MPs in assisting the Ulster party in questions affecting labour.   Mr Thompson Donald MP said that Sinn Feiners were ousting people out of their jobs and Government should see that the demobilised soldiers got work.
After the 1916 rising in Dublin and the continuing northern resistance to Home Rule the British government realised that there was not going to be a simple solution to the ongoing political problems in Ireland. In October 1919 a Cabinet committee was set up to review the Irish ‘problem’ and in February 1920 the Government of Ireland Bill was introduced at Westminster. It proposed two Home Rule parliaments in Ireland, one for most of the country, based in Dublin, and the other for the north, based in Belfast, with both to have strictly limited powers and continuing representation at Westminster. 
The Ulster Unionists were now faced with having their own Parliament, which they had never sought. However, they realised that it would strengthen their position. There was then debate about the size of the North – would it include the nine counties of Ulster, a more compact six counties or the four mainly Protestant counties of Down, Londonderry, Tyrone and Antrim?   The Unionists quailed at the thought of trying to govern the 80% Catholic nationalist counties of Cavan, Monaghan and Donegal. A four county area was not economically viable so the six counties – Antrim, Armagh, Down, Fermanagh, Londonderry and Tyrone -  became Northern Ireland.  
On 22 July 1920 in the House of Commons Joe Devlin, the MP for West Belfast, asked questions of the Chief Secretary for Ireland regarding recent disturbances in Harland & Wolff when all the Catholic workers had been expelled.   Thompson Donald stated ‘this is not a question of Catholic and Protestant at all, but of Unionists and Sinn Feiners…….these Protestants and Unionists were justified, in view of the fact that the Sinn Feiners were armed with revolvers, and immediately they produced revolvers the Unionists knocked them down’.  The Chief Secretary ended the debate, having answered none of Joe Devlin's questions, by saying "everything has been done before the 12th July, on the 12th, since the 12th, and now to preserve order in one of the most difficult areas in His Majesty’s Dominions".

Northern Ireland election of 1921 
Elections for the new 52 seat Northern Ireland Parliament were arranged for 24 May 1921 using the proportional representation system of voting for the first time. On Tuesday 3 May Carson gave his message to Ulster. It was sent from his home in Eaton Place, London – ‘Imperative need for Unity with an appeal to his supporters to apply themselves with their characteristic energy and determination to the founding of a Parliament which will be worthy of their community.’ At a meeting in East Belfast Thompson Donald MP gave a short speech  in which he said ‘the North would certainly have a Parliament functioning in the month of June, and he hoped the South would also have a Parliament functioning in the month of June. That was the key to the political solution of the Irish problem.’
Saturday 14 May 1921 was nomination day and 77 candidates were put forward for 52 seats.  Wednesday 25 May was election day and the results were published on Friday 27 May.  In East Belfast the four Unionist candidates were elected, with Thompson Donald coming third. All 40 Unionist candidates were returned. The other 12 who had been elected were either Nationalist or Sinn Féin and they refused to take their seats so it was effectively a one party Parliament. Carson was now 67 and in declining health so Sir James Craig became the first Prime Minister of Northern Ireland.

In the House of Commons on 3 March 1922 the question of boundaries again arose because the Unionists were concerned that Westminster was going to nibble off bits of Tyrone, Fermanagh and Londonderry and give them to the Provisional government in Dublin.  The debate became heated and both Joe Devlin and Thompson Donald were told by the Speaker that they were out of order.  It was decided that the Parliament in NI would sort out the boundaries.

From the records of the NI Hansards it can be seen that Thompson Donald was involved in many debates, asked many questions of ministers and it appeared that the NI Parliament was making a genuine effort to resolve problems despite the constraints imposed on them by Westminster. In this same period the South was slowly and painfully negotiating its separation from Britain.  In August 1922 Griffith died and Collins was assassinated.  Cosgrove took over and he and Craig met in London and discovered they could agree to differ. With Parliaments established in both Dublin and Belfast Ireland settled down to Partition.
In a debate on 26 June 1922 on the second reading of a Bill to abolish Proportional Representation (PR) as a voting system in future Northern Ireland elections Thompson Donald said that he did not like PR because it was cumbersome. However, he went on to ask  ‘Where do the minority come in? There is no minority represented in this House. I do contend that PR gives minority representation, and I think in all fairness the minority should have representation.’         
In 1922 Thompson Donald again ran in the Westminster elections but lost, and in the 1925 election for the NI Parliament he was also defeated.  A note in a NI Labour news-sheet in May 1925 stated ‘If Dame Rumour is true, another of our stupid Cabinet Ministers was able to avert defeat by the sacrifices made by Thompson Donald, whose friends were appealed to vote ‘1’ for Sir Dawson Bates’.

So came to an end Donald's active participation in politics.

Later years 
Shortly after 1925 Thompson Donald became caretaker of the Petty Sessions courts in Town Hall Street off Victoria Street in Belfast.  He subsequently lived in London for some years.  He returned to Belfast where he died of natural causes in 1957. His obituary was published in the Belfast Telegraph.

References

External links
 

1876 births
1957 deaths
Ulster Unionist Party members of the House of Commons of Northern Ireland
Members of the House of Commons of Northern Ireland 1921–1925
Members of the Parliament of the United Kingdom for Belfast constituencies (1801–1922)
UK MPs 1918–1922
Members of the House of Commons of Northern Ireland for Belfast constituencies